Maddur is a mandal in Mahbubnagar district, Telangana.

Geography
It has an average elevation of 503 metres (1653 ft).

Villages
The villages in Maddur mandal include:
 Appireddi Palle 	
 Bhooned/Buneed 
This village is well connected to district headquarters Mahabubnagar, maddur, narayanpeta and Kosgi by road. It is 40 km far from mahabubnagar, for every one hour two buses fly between mahaboobnagar and this village. This village is famous for Anjaneya Temple.
population of this village: ~2500
sex ratio: ~0.98(98 per females per 100 males)
official languages:Telugu, Urdu
crops: rice, cotton, ground nut
 Chanwar 	
 Chennareddipally 	           
 Krishna Naik Gtanka, Pedripad
 Damaganpuram 	
 Dorepalle 	
 Duppatghat
 Gokulnagar 	
 Jadavaraopally 	
 Kajipuram 	
 Kisannagar 	
 Kommuru 	
 Kothapalle 	
 Lingalched 	
 Maddur
 Mannapur 	
 Mominapur 	
 Nagireddipally 	
 Nandigam 	
 Nandipad 	
 Nidjintha 
 Pallerla 	
 Pedripahad KRISHNA NAYAK TANDA
 Renvatla 	
 Thimmareddipalle* PEDRIPAD TANDA
This village is well connected to district headquarters Mahabubnagar, maddur, narayanpeta and raichur by road. It is 30 km far from mahabubnagar, for every one hour two buses fly between mahaboobnagar and this village. This village is famous for Shivaji Temple.
population of this village: ~600
sex ratio: ~0.98(98 per females per 100 males)
official languages:Telugu, Urdu
crops: rice, cotton....etc.

References

Mandals in Mahbubnagar district